Yazid ibn Mazyad al-Shaybani (died 801) was an Arab general and governor who served the Abbasid Caliphate.

Biography 
Yazid was member of the Shayban tribe, dominant in the region of Diyar Bakr in the northern Jazira. The first member of his family to rise to prominence was his uncle, Ma'n ibn Za'ida al-Shaybani, under the Umayyads. Although Ma'n fought against the Abbasid Revolution, he reconciled himself with the Abbasid regime and both he and his sons, Za'ida and Sharahil held governorships and high military posts.

Yazid first served under Ma'n during the latter's governorship in Sistan, where Ma'n fell in battle against the local Kharijites in 769. Under Caliph al-Mahdi, he fought against Yusuf al-Barm in Khurasan, and in 782 took part in the great campaign against the Byzantine Empire under the future Caliph Harun al-Rashid's. Yazid accompanied al-Mahdi's eldest son and successor al-Hadi to his governorship of Jurjan in 783/784. After al-Hadi became Caliph, Yazid supported him in his intention—ultimately cut short by his death—to remove Harun from the succession in favour of al-Hadi's own son.

Yazid's loyalty was rewarded by al-Hadi with his appointment to the governorship  (ostikan) of Arminiya (a large province encompassing the whole of Transcaucasia), which he governed until 788/789. His rule was harsh towards the native Christian population, and he carried out large-scale colonization of the province, particularly at Shirvan, with Arab Muslims. He was also the first of a long line of Shaybanid ostikans, beginning with his sons, and hence the progenitor of the Mazyadid dynasty that ruled in Shirvan as autonomous and later independent emirs (Shirvanshahs) until 1027.

After his tenure in Arminiya, Yazid was sent to combat a Kharijite rebellion led by the fellow-Shaybanid al-Walid ibn Tarif (795/796). Yazid succeeded in defeating and killing the rebel leader in battle, ending the uprising. Yazid was re-appointed as ostikan in 799, in time to face the last Khazar attack on the Caliphate's Caucasian provinces, which he defeated. He died in Armenia in 801, and was succeeded by his son Asad.

References

Sources
 
 

8th-century births
801 deaths
Abbasid governors of Arminiya
Generals of the Abbasid Caliphate
Abbasid people of the Arab–Byzantine wars
Abbasid people of the Arab–Khazar wars
Banu Shayban
8th-century Arabs
9th-century Arabs